Mohammed Abdel-Jawad (born May 1, 1979) is a Palestinian footballer who plays as a central defender for Palestine football club Al-Birah. In 1994, he served as the team's captain.

References

External links

1979 births
Living people
Palestinian footballers

Association football defenders
Palestine international footballers